Chuang Yi Publishing Pte Ltd. was a publishing company based in Singapore that specialized in producing domestic and imported comics and comics-related merchandise in English and simplified Chinese. Chuang Yi distributed all or some of its products in Singapore, India, Malaysia and the Philippines. Distribution to Australia and New Zealand occurred through Madman Entertainment and used Australian English translations.

The company is now defunct after ceasing operations in late 2013 and going into liquidation in the following months. Shogakukan Asia formed as the company's successor in regards to its intellectual properties.

History
Chuang Yi Publishing was founded in 1990 as a distributor of Japanese comics published in simplified Chinese. It had early success with Dragon Ball and Slam Dunk, and soon began importing titles from Hong Kong, Taiwan, and South Korea.

In 1995, Chuang Yi set up its first branch office in Kuala Lumpur, Malaysia, and launched two Japanese comic series in Malay. In 1998 and 1999, Chuang Yi published its first TV-drama-to-comic adaptations of Legend of the Eight Immortals and Liang Po Po. Chuang Yi expanded into the English-language market in 2000 with the launch of its Pokémon series, and two Taiwanese comics began serialisation in local newspapers. In 2003, Chuang Yi secured licensing rights to distribute its comics to Australia, New Zealand, and the Philippines, and in 2004 branched into the magazine market including licensing of several Disney titles. Chuang Yi began distribution of sticker collectibles from Panini Comics and Topps UK in 2004 and 2005, and in 2006 began distribution of comics in India. In 2007, the company secured the rights to develop stationery merchandise for Pokémon and Disney products, and began exclusive distribution of DC Comics and Marvel Comics products to Singapore and Malaysia.

Chuang Yi ceased operations in late 2013 and went into liquidation in the following months. Shogakukan Asia purchased the company's intellectual properties and acts as its successor in that capacity.

Manga published in Chinese

20th Century Boys (20世纪少年)
21st Century Boys (21世纪少年)
Absolute Boyfriend (绝对男友)
Air Gear
Blaue Rosen (摇滚下的蓝色蔷薇)
Bleach (死神)
Bloody Monday
D.Gray-Man
Death Note (死亡笔记)
Detective Conan (名侦探柯南)
Doraemon (哆啦A梦)
Dragon Ball (七龙珠)
Eyeshield 21
Fairy Tail
Fruits Basket (水果篮子)
Fullmetal Alchemist (钢之炼金术师)
Flame of Recca (烈火之炎)
Fushigi Yuugi Genbu Kaiden
GetBackers
Hayate the Combat Butler (疾风守护者)
Hikaru no Go (棋灵王)
Katekyo Hitman Reborn (家庭教师HITMAN REBORN!)
Kekkaishi (结界师)
Kindaichi Case Files (金田一少年之事件簿)
Konjiki no Gash!! (魔童小子)
Initial D (头文字D)
Love Celeb (情迷贵公子)
MÄR
MÄR Omega

Melancholic Princess (傾國怨伶)
Monster Soul
Naruto (火影忍者)
NANA
Negima!: Magister Negi Magi (魔法老师)
Ninkuu (忍空)
Ninkuu SECOND STAGE
One Piece
Ouran High Host Club (Ouran High School Host Club in North America, Ōran Kōkō Hosuto Kurabu in Japan)
Placebo
Prince of Tennis (网球王子)
PSYCHO BUSTERS (超能力少年)
Saint Seiya EPISODE G (圣斗士星矢 EPISODE.G)
Samurai Deeper Kyo (鬼眼狂刀 Kyo)
Special A
Shaman King (通灵童子)
SS: Racer's Special (SS：赛车手特别篇)
Tactics
The Gentlemen's Alliance
The King of Blaze (火王)
To Love-Ru (To Love恋爱大麻烦)
Tsubasa: Reservoir Chronicle (TSUBASA翼)
Vampire Knight  (吸血鬼士)
M×0
W-change
xxxHolic (迷梦魔法屋 XXX HOLIC)
Yankee-kun to Megane-chan (不良少年与四眼妹)

Manga published in English

.hack//Legend of the Twilight
Absolute Boyfriend ("Zettai Kareshi")
Astro Boy (Akira Himekawa's series)
Ballad of a Shinigami
Battle B-Daman
Beyblade
Blaue Rosen (Japanese title: Ai wo Utau yori Ore ni Oborero)
Bakegyamon
Because You Smile when I Sing
Bio Booster Armor Guyver
Bloody Monday
Boys Esté
Captive Hearts
Chrono Crusade
Crush Gear Turbo
Digimon
Doraemon (bilingual)
Fairy Cube
FIGHT! Crush Gear Turbo
Flunk Punk Rumble (Yankee-kun to Megane-chan)
Fruits Basket
Fullmetal Alchemist
Full Metal Panic! Sigma
Fushigi Yûgi (Including Fushigi Yûgi Genbu Kaiden)
Fushigiboshi no Futagohime (Twin Princesses of the Wonder Planet)
Girls Bravo
Gundam
Gundam Seed
Hamtaro Handbook
Hellsing
Hoshi wa Utau
Imadoki!
Kingdom Hearts
Kingdom Hearts: Chain of Memories
Kingdom Hearts II
La Corda D'Oro
Land of the Blindfolded
Love Hina
Maburaho
MÄR
Medabots
Metal Fight Beyblade
Midori Days
Mirmo!
Mon Colle Knights
Monochrome Factor
My-HiME
My Fair Lady known in North America as The Wallflower and Yamato nadeshiko Shichihenge in Japan
Negima! Magister Negi Magi
Neon Genesis Evangelion
Otomen
Ouran High School Host Club

Over Rev!
Phantom Dream
Pokémon
Pokémon: The Electric Tale of Pikachu
Pokémon Adventures
Magical Pokémon Journey
Ash & Pikachu
Phantom Thief Pokémon 7
Pokémon Gold & Silver The Golden Boys
Pokémon Pocket Monsters
Pokémon Ruby-Sapphire
Pokémon Jirachi Wish Maker
Pokémon Destiny Deoxys
Pokémon: Lucario and the Mystery of Mew
Pokémon Ranger and the Temple of the Sea
Pokémon Battle Frontier
Pokémon Diamond and Pearl Adventure!
Placebo
RahXephon
S · A: Special A
Saiyuki: Reload
Slam Dunk
Solar Boy Django
Speed Grapher
Spriggan
SuperPsychic Nanaki (Chōshinri Genshō Nōryokusha Nanaki)
SS: Special Stage
Tactics
Tenchi Muyo!
There, Beyond The Beyond (Sono Mukou-no Mukougawa)
The Girl Who Leapt Through Time
The Melancholy of Haruhi Suzumiya
The Mythical Detective Loki
The Mythical Detective Loki Ragnarok
Tokyo Mew Mew
Trinity Blood
Trigun
Tsubasa: Reservoir Chronicle
Tsubasa: Those with Wings
Vagabond
Vampire Knight
Venus in Love
Wangan Midnight
Wangan Midnight: C1 Runner
Wild Adapter
Wings of Desire
World Embryo
X
Young Guns
Super Yo-Yo
Zatch Bell! (Konjiki no Gash!!)
Zig Zag
Zoids

Other comic magazines published in English
After 2004, Chuang Yi published magazines based licensed franchises, accompanied by themed real-world events, graphic novels, sticker books, and other merchandise. The magazine contents were Singapore-specific. The franchises include:

 Disney Princess
 Disney Fairies
 Winx Club (up to issue #39; MediaCorp has handled Winx from No. 40 onwards)
 W.I.T.C.H.

In the past they also produced Winnie-the-Pooh and Monster Allergy franchise magazines. Chuang Yi also distributed two imported magazines from Australia: Bratz from Otter Press, and Krash from Nuclear Media and Publishing. It also held licenses to produce and distribute a variety of stationery products, children's toys, keychains, and stickers for the Pokémon and Looney Tunes franchises.

Manhwa published in English
Ragnarok: Into The Abyss

See also

 Shogakukan Asia

References

External links
 (Archive)

Manga distributors
Manhwa distributors
Publishing companies of Singapore
Manhua distributors
Publishing companies established in 1990
Publishing companies disestablished in 2013